The Education Act 2002 (c.32) is an Act of the Parliament of the United Kingdom that gave schools greater autonomy to implement experimental teaching methods.

Main provisions
The act significantly amended legislation relating to academies, publicly funded schools operating outside of local government control and with a significant degree of autonomy areas such as wages and digressing from the national curriculum. Academies were originally set up under the Learning and Skills Act 2000 under the name "city academies", and were renamed to "academies" by this act.

Schools which have innovative ideas to improve education, but are prevented by an existing law from implementing them, will be able to apply for exemption from that law.

Schools which demonstrate a high standard of teaching will be given exemption national controls such as the national curriculum, agreements on teachers' pay and conditions and the way the scheduling of the school day and terms.

Schools designating or re-designating as specialist schools could now gain specialisms in Business and Enterprise, Engineering, Mathematics and Computing and Science.

The act imposes various minimum standards for private schools in areas such as health and safety and space requirements.

List of provisions
Power to innovate (sections 1-5)
Earned autonomy (sections 6-10)
School companies (sections 11-13)
Grant-making power (sections 14-18)
Governance (sections 19-40)
School funding (sections 41-45)
School admission, exclusion and attendance, (section 46-53)
Powers of intervention (sections 54-64)
Academies (sections 65-69)
Early years (sections 149-156)
Independent schools (sections 157-174)
Student loans (section 186)
Inter-authority recoupment (sections 206-207)
Identify school funds

References

External links
 Explanatory notes to the Education Act 2002 from UK Statute Law Database

United Kingdom Education Acts
United Kingdom Acts of Parliament 2002
2002 in education
July 2002 events in the United Kingdom